Rolf Kiær (17 June 1897 – 1975) is a Norwegian hydrographer.

He was born in Trondhjem. He was hired in the Norwegian Hydrographic Service in 1920, and in Norges Svalbard- og Ishavsundersøkelser in 1929. Here, he took part in expeditions to Svalbard and Eastern Greenland. From 1936 to 1967 he was the director of the Norwegian Hydrographic Service.

References

1897 births
1975 deaths
Norwegian hydrographers
Directors of government agencies of Norway